Neil Dieterich (born March 28, 1943)  was an American politician and lawyer.

Dieterich was born in Lincoln, Nebraska. He received his bachelor's degrees from  Wharton School of the University of Pennsylvania and from University of Minnesota. Dieterich also received his Juris Doctor degree from University of Minnesota Law School and was admitted to the Minnesota bar. He lived with his wife and family in Saint Paul, Minnesota. Dieterich served in the Minnesota House of Representatives from 1973 to 1976 and in the Minnesota Senate from 1977 to 1986. He was a Democrat.

References

1943 births
Living people
Politicians from Lincoln, Nebraska
Politicians from Saint Paul, Minnesota
Minnesota lawyers
University of Minnesota alumni
University of Minnesota Law School alumni
Wharton School of the University of Pennsylvania alumni
Democratic Party members of the Minnesota House of Representatives
Democratic Party Minnesota state senators